Blaiklock Glacier is a glacier  long, flowing north from Turnpike Bluff, then northwest to Mount Provender and Mount Lowe in the western part of the Shackleton Range, Antarctica. It was first mapped in 1957 by the Commonwealth Trans-Antarctic Expedition (CTAE), and named for Kenneth V. Blaiklock, the leader of the advance party of the CTAE in 1955–56 and a surveyor with the transpolar party in 1956–58.

See also
 List of glaciers in the Antarctic
 Glaciology

References 

Glaciers of Coats Land